Glenea proxima is a species of beetle in the family Cerambycidae. It was described by Lameere in 1893.

References

proxima
Beetles described in 1893